Frederick Coates (16 November 1879 – 1956) was an English footballer who played in the Football League for Glossop.

References

1879 births
1956 deaths
English footballers
Association football midfielders
English Football League players
Glossop North End A.F.C. players